Fourth Man or variant may refer to:
 "The Fourth Man", an Agatha Christie short story first published in 1933
 De vierde man (The Fourth Man), a 1981 Dutch novel
 The Fourth Man (1983 film), a Dutch film directed by Paul Verhoeven based on the novel
 The Fourth Man (2007 film), a Serbian film directed by Dejan Zečević
 A character in the Planetary comic book series. See List of Planetary characters#Elijah Snow

See also
 4 Man, officiating method used in hockey